Ascute uteoides is a species of calcareous sponge found in Australia.

References

Animals described in 1893
Sponges of Australia
Ascute
Taxa named by Arthur Dendy